Apple Trees is a 1992 German drama film directed by Helma Sanders-Brahms. It was screened in the Un Certain Regard section at the 1992 Cannes Film Festival.

Cast

References

External links

1992 films
1992 drama films
1990s German-language films
German drama films
Films directed by Helma Sanders-Brahms
1990s German films